Masdevallia meleagris is a species of orchid endemic to Colombia.

References

External links 
 
 
 

meleagris
Endemic orchids of Colombia